The Class 85 was a German goods train tank engine and standard locomotive (Einheitslok) with the Deutsche Reichsbahn.

History 
In 1931, the DRG ordered ten locomotives from the firm of Henschel that were taken into the fleet as numbers 85 001 to 85 010. The Class 85 was intended for hauling passenger and goods trains. They were however also employed as pusher locomotives on the Höllentalbahn in the Black Forest. Thanks to this engine, the Höllental Railway could do away with rack railway operations from 1933. The running gear and the superheated system were taken from the  Class 44. The boiler, with a few minor alterations, was the same as that of the Class 62. All the locomotives were stabled at the Freiburg shed. One engine, number 85 007, was still in service in Wuppertal until the end of the year, but they were all retired by the beginning of the next year.

Preserved locomotives 
Number 85 007 belongs to the town of Freiburg im Breisgau. It is not operational, but is maintained by the Bahn-Sozialwerk-Gruppe. The engine is housed in the former locomotive shed.

References

External links 
 History of the Class 85 in the Höllental, Black Forest

85
2-10-2T locomotives
85
Henschel locomotives
Railway locomotives introduced in 1932
Standard gauge locomotives of Germany
1′E1′ h3t locomotives
Freight locomotives